The Manufacturers' Mutual Accident Insurance Association Limited was an Australian insurance company founded in 1914 primarily targeting the Workers' Compensation market. It was renamed Manufacturers Mutual Insurance, abbreviated MMI in 1920.

In 1960 the company acquired The Western Australian Insurance Company Limited, expanding again in 1989 with the acquisition of Chamber of Manufacturers Insurance. The final acquisition was in 1993 for Switzerland Insurance Australia Limited.

The company was known for its subsidiary lines, starting in 1987 with Combrook Pty Limited, an injury rehabilitation provider, and 1997 introducing DirecDial Financial Services Limited and SafetyNet Services Pty Ltd. DirecDial and SafetyNet was later integrated within the mainline businesses. Combrook was never integrated and remained a separate company as Workers' Compensation legislation prohibits insurance companies from also being the rehabilitation provider due to conflict of interest.

MMI was listed on the ASX in 1994. It was taken over by Allianz in 1998 though it continued to trade as MMI. The company was rebranded as Allianz Australia in 2000 when the company then ceased.

References

Financial services companies established in 1914
Financial services companies disestablished in 2000
Financial services companies based in Sydney
Manufacturers Mutual Insurance (MMI) (Dissolved)
Defunct financial services companies of Australia
Australian companies established in 1914
Australian companies disestablished in 2000